Consuelo Guerrero de Luna (1905–1972) was a Spanish film actress who settled in Mexico. She appeared in more than fifty films including the 1945 historical film The White Monk.

Selected filmography
 The Unknown Policeman (1941)
 Summer Hotel (1944)
 The Lieutenant Nun (1944)
 The White Monk (1945)
 The Thief (1947)
 Spurs of Gold (1948)
 Take Me in Your Arms (1954)
 Ash Wednesday (1958)

References

Bibliography
 Paco Ignacio Taibo. María Félix: 47 pasos por el cine. Bruguera, 2008.

External links

1905 births
1972 deaths
Mexican film actresses
Spanish film actresses
Spanish emigrants to Mexico
People from Madrid